Ruby Ora Williams (1926–2009) was an American literary scholar and bibliographer, known for her bibliographies of black women's writing.

Life
Ora Williams was the daughter of Ida Bolles (Roach) Williams. She became professor at California State University, Long Beach in 1968. A participant in the university's pioneering equal opportunities program, she and Clyde Taylor designed and shaped the black studies program at CSU in the early 1970s. She retired in 1988.

Works
 'A Bibliography of Works Written by American Black Women', College Language Association Journal, 1972. Published in book form as American Black women in the arts and social sciences : a bibliographic survey, Metuchen, N.J. : Scarecrow Press, 1973.
 An In-Depth Portrait of Alice Dunbar-Nelson, Ph.D. dissertation, University of California at Irvine, 1974
 (ed.) Works of Eva Jessye
 An In-Depth Portrait of Alice Dunbar-Nelson, 1975
 'Works by and About Alice Ruth (Moore) Dunbar-Nelson: A Bibliography', College Language Association Journal 19 (1976)
 (ed.) American Black Women in the Arts and Social Sciences: A Bibliographic Survey, 1978
 (ed.) An Alice Dunbar-Nelson Reader. Washington, DC: University Press of America, 1979.
 Just like a meteor: a bio-bibliography of the life and works of Charles William Williams, a New Jersey African-American, Glassboro, N.J.: Meteor Books, 1994

References

1926 births
2009 deaths
American literary historians
American bibliographers
Women bibliographers
American women historians
Women literary historians
20th-century American historians
20th-century American women writers
California State University, Long Beach faculty
21st-century American women